;login: is a long-running technical journal published by the USENIX Association, focusing on the UNIX operating system and system administration in general. It was founded by Mel Ferentz in 1975 as UNIX News, changing its name to ;login: in 1977. Currently, issues from 1997 through the present are available online directly from USENIX, whereas issues between 1983 and 2000 have been archived in the Internet Archive since 2018.

The leading semicolon is a reference to the appearance of the login prompt of early versions of UNIX, where an escape code specific to the Teletype model 37 computer terminal would appear as a semicolon on other models of terminal.

References

External links
;login: - The USENIX Magazine — issues since 1998
 — archive of issues between 1983 and 2000

Computer magazines published in the United States
Magazines established in 1975